Magnetic braking may refer to:

 Magnetic braking (astronomy), the loss of a star's angular momentum due to its magnetic field
 Eddy current brake, the use of magnetic induction to stop or slow a moving object